The Republic of Uhtua (or the Republic of East Karelia) was an unrecognized state, with the focus of a state led by Finns. It existed from 1919 to 1920, created out of five Volosts in the Kemsky Uyezd of the Arkhangelsk Governorate, now in the Republic of Karelia. The capital of the republic was the village of Uhtua (now Kalevala).

Prelude 
In 1911, the Union was banned, but it was later revived in 1922 as the Academic Karelia Society, to take a direct part in the creation of the Republic of Uhtua.

After the Bolsheviks came to power, most of the peasants of Karelia fell under the definition of a kulak and were subject to loss of grain and cattle. This, as well as finding Karelians in combat zones during the civil wars in Russia and Finland, and foreign military intervention in northern Russia persuaded the population to all following events.

Two years before the state was created, the Heimosodat began. They were a series of expeditions to capture the Finnic lands that were under Soviet rule, to create a bigger Finland. During the Aunus and Viena expeditions, short-lived bases, or governments, existed in Olonets Karelia and White Karelia.

Finnish intervention 
The Republic was created during the Finnish Civil War, after White Guard units, which occupied the area in late March of 1918, placed the villages of Vuokkiniemi and Uhtua under direct order from Carl Wilhelm Malm. In the villages and the surrounding counties, a local government was organized under the leadership of patriotic supporters for the independence of Karelia from the RSFSR - The Committee of Uhtua, which was led by Tuisku. We also know the name of another member of the Toimikunta - Paavo Ahava.

History 

Finally, the state took shape on 21 July 1919, together with the establishment of the Provisional Government of White Karelia, headed by S. Tikhonov. The center of the village territorial entity was Uhtua. Initially, the state was chosen to be a part of Finland, and on 14 November 1919, Tikhonov appointed a request to the Government of Finland. Later, however, the state was established as an independent state in alliance with Finland.

On 21 March 1920, the Government convened a congress of representatives of 11 northern counties of concern to the Provisional Government of White Karelia. The congress was attended by 116 delegates.

On the first day of the Congress, the issue of state symbols was addressed.

On 29 March 1920, the symbols were finally approved. The author of the sketches was the Finnish artist Akseli Gallen-Kallela. The coat of arms was a red-green bicolour Varangian shield, topped with traditional headdress loggers. The shield was a picture of a bear in black with a vesuri in their paws. By the bear's feet was a black chain, and above it were white sparks northern lights. The national flag was a black Scandinavian cross with a red border, situated on a green cloth. The colors of the flag symbolize the following: green - a symbol of the country's forest and nature, red - bloodshed for the homeland, and the joy and fire, as in the ancient Karelians used slash-and-burn agriculture, black - the native land and sadness. On the state flag, it had a red canton with white northern lights. The war flag was made in the same style but had three plaits and a complementary Bear with a  vesuri in the clutches (there is evidence that in the center of the black cross on it was a red square). There was also a pilot flag (luotsilippu), postal flag (postilippu), a customs flag (tullilippu), and a war pennant, in a similar manner to Finnish Household pennants.

The congress decided to secede from Soviet Russia and, guided by the Soviet authorities declared the principle of "the right of nations to self-determination", they declared independence as the Republic of Uhtua. The declaration of the Congress stated: "Karelia itself must govern their own affairs and to secede from Russia". The congress also thanked Finland for their promise to "help and support", who had a representative at the Congress present. The Government was renamed the Provisional Government of Karelia.

In late April 1920, at a station, a delegation of Karelian Beloostrov interim government and handed over to the requirement of the separation of Karelia from Soviet Russia Soviet border troops Commissioner.

Based on the decisions of the Congress, in May 1920 the Republic of Uhtua was recognized by Finland, which even gave the republic a loan of 8 million Finnish markka. However, on 18 May 1920 the Red Army went to Uhtua to claim back the republic. The state government fled to the village Vuokkiniemi, which was 30 km from the Soviet-Finnish border, from where they moved to Finland.

Karelia remained a part of the RSFSR, where on its territory on June 8, 1920, was formed autonomous regional association Karelian Labor Commune that existed until 25 July 1923, when it was formed as the Karelian ASSR.

During the negotiations between the RSFSR and Finland, the Finns promoted territorial claims to Karelia, but due to the Red Army's size, the Finnish government was forced to abandon the idea. As a result, on 14 October 1920, the Treaty of Tartu was signed between the RSFSR and Finland.

The East Karelian Uprising 

However, as it turned out, the Government of Finland and Karelian supporters of independence were not going to completely abandon their claims. 10 December 1920 in Vyborg the Karelian united government was created, which, in addition to the Provisional Government of Karelia, became the Olonets government and other national education.

In October 1921 in the territory of the Karelian Labour Commune in Tungudskoy parish was established as the underground Karelian Temporary Committee. In November and December 1921, the Finnish troops reoccupied part of the regions of Karelia, which began the Soviet–Finnish conflict. In Karelia, martial law was imposed, commander of the Karelian Front was appointed commander of A. I. Sedyakin. By early January 1922, the units from Petrozavodsk of the Red Army defeated the main group of Finns, and in early February 1922 the Center Committee Karelian village of Uhtua was re-occupied by the Red Army. As a result of the successes of Soviet troops, Finland was forced to cease hostilities. The Republic of Uhtua ceased to exist.

Gallery

See also 
 Russo-Finnish wars
 Finland–Russia relations
 North Ingria
 Aunus expedition

References

External links 
 

1918 establishments in Europe
1920 disestablishments in Europe
Former republics
Former unrecognized countries
History of the Republic of Karelia
Post–Russian Empire states
States and territories established in 1918
States and territories disestablished in 1920